The Sanctuary of Zeus Polieus was a walled open-air sanctuary dedicated to Zeus Polieus (city protector) around 500 BC on the Acropolis of Athens, sited to the Erechtheion's east. None of its foundations have been discovered and its trapezoid plan and many entrances have been worked out from rock cuttings on the Acropolis. The eastern area of the sanctuary is thought to have housed the oxen for the annual Bouphonia or ox-sacrificing. Its main entrance had a pediment.

Pausanias described the Homarium at Aegium in the 2nd century: 
[On the Akropolis of Athens :] There are statues of Zeus, one made by Leokhares and one called Polieus (Of the City, the customary mode of sacrificing to whom I will give without adding the traditional reason thereof. Upon the altar of Zeus Polieus they place barley mixed with wheat and leave it unguarded. The ox, which they keep already prepared for sacrifice, goes to the altar and partakes of the grain. One of the priests they call the ox-slayer, who kills the ox and then, casting aside the axe here according to the ritual runs away. The others bring the axe to trial, as though they know not the man who did the deed.

References

Sources
http://www.ancient-greece.org/architecture/zeus-polieus.html

6th-century BC religious buildings and structures
Acropolis of Athens
Ancient Greek buildings and structures in Athens
Temples in ancient Athens
Temples of Zeus

Destroyed temples